The Letov Š-7 was a single-seat, single-engine biplane fighter aircraft designed and built in Czechoslovakia in the early 1920s. It was designed for a single-seat fighter competition but did not reach production.

Design and development

The Letov Š-7 was designed for a 1923 government competition for a single-engine fighter, to be powered by a Škoda licence-built Hispano-Suiza 8Fb, a  water-cooled V-8 engine.  It was a single-bay biplane, the bays defined by parallel pairs of interplane struts. The wings, mounted with modest stagger, were straight edged and had the same constant chord and blunt wingtips. The upper wing was braced to the fuselage with a cabane formed, on each side, by a forward parallel pair of struts from the mid-fuselage and a rear inverted-V pair from the upper fuselage.  Only the lower planes carried ailerons.

Letov experienced some cooling problems with the Š-7's water-cooled engine.  The aircraft as first flown had a ring-shaped radiator, but this was replaced with a transversely mounted, circular cross-section ventral radiator and the engine cowling revised. The modification resulted in a change of designation to Letov Š-7a. The Hispano engine drove a two-blade propeller with a domed spinner. Behind the engine, the fuselage had an oval cross-section, with the single open cockpit partially under the wing trailing edge, which had a shallow cutout to enhance his view.  The fuselage tapered rearwards to a point behind the tail control surfaces.  The straight edged, cropped lozenge-shaped horizontal tail was mounted on the fuselage centreline; the fin and rudder were also straight edged.  The Š-7 had a fixed, single-axle conventional undercarriage, with mainwheels on cross-braced V-struts.  It was armed with a pair of 7.7 mm (0.303 in) machine guns, mounted in a dip in the engine cowling between the two cylinder banks, firing through the propeller arc.

The Letov Š-7 first flew in 1923 but failed to gain orders and its development was discontinued.

Variants
Letov Š-7 Original ring-shaped radiator.
Letov Š-7a Ventral radiator and modified cowling.

Specifications

References

1920s Czechoslovakian fighter aircraft
Letov aircraft
Single-engined tractor aircraft
Biplanes
Aircraft first flown in 1923